Sergey or Sergei Nikitin may refer to:

 Sergey Nikitin (musician), Russian bard
 Sergei Vasilyevich Nikitin (b. 1963), Soviet and Russian footballer
 Sergey Nikitin (historian), Russian historian and founder of Moskultprog
 Sergei Nikitin (geologist) (1851–1909), a Russian geologist
 Sergey Nikitin (decathlete) (born 1973), Russian decathlete and medallist at the European Cup Combined Events